George Thomason may refer to:

 George Thomason (book collector)
 George Thomason (footballer)